The 2009 Campbell Fighting Camels football team represented Campbell University in the 2009 NCAA Division I FCS football season as a member of the Pioneer Football League (PFL). The Fighting Camels were led by second-year head coach Dale Steele and played their home games at Barker–Lane Stadium. Campbell  finished the season 3–8 overall and 2–6 in PFL play to place fifth.

Schedule

References

Campbell
Campbell Fighting Camels football seasons
Campbell Fighting Camels football